Seven Oaks Reservoir is a reservoir on the Santa Ana River in San Bernardino County, California, about  northeast of the city of Redlands. The reservoir is formed by Seven Oaks Dam, which was completed in 1999.

The United States Army Corps of Engineers built the zoned earth-and-rock-fill dam at the foot of the San Bernardino Mountains to protect against flooding in the eastern portion of the Greater Los Angeles Area.

See also
List of dams and reservoirs in California
List of lakes in California

References
 
United States Army Corps of Engineers - Seven Oaks Dam Data

Reservoirs in San Bernardino County, California
Santa Ana River
San Bernardino Mountains
Reservoirs in California
Reservoirs in Southern California